Richard Osman's House of Games is a British quiz show produced by Remarkable Television, a branch of Banijay (owners of Endemol Shine UK) for the BBC. The show is hosted by Richard Osman. It is played on a weekly basis, with four "celebrities" playing on five consecutive days to win daily prizes, and the weekly prize of being crowned as "House of Games" champion. Points are accrued depending on where each celebrity finishes on each day and the points are doubled on Friday's show. During filming for series 6, Richard celebrated his (and the show's) 500th episode.

Format
Osman sits on a chair to the left of the screen, while the four celebrities sit on adjoining chairs. Osman hits a button on his table, activating a round generator, which is displayed on a big screen. He then explains what the round is about and in what format it will take place. For instance, whether it is a buzzer round, a pairs round or one where the players require use of their tablet computers. Five rounds are played each day, with the second round being played in pairs, and the final round always being "Answer Smash". In most games, a point is awarded for each correct answer, but in "Answer Smash", points are also deducted for incorrect answers.

At the end of each day, the scores are announced and the winner wins a daily prize, which is usually a normal everyday object of some description with the "House of Games" logo imprinted on it (the logo being a turquoise-blue background with a depiction of Osman's hair, eyebrows and glasses). The points are then converted to four points for the winner, three for second place, two for third place and one for fourth place onto the weekly leader board with the points doubling to 8, 6, 4 and 2 for Friday's "Double Points Friday" edition. The weekly winner receives the "House of Games" trophy (a silver cup with the Osman depiction on it) from Osman. If there are 2 players tied for first place at the end of the week, both players are declared joint-winners and win a trophy each.

Starting in Series 3, special "House of Champions" episodes aired featuring players who had previously won a daily or weekly edition of the show coming back for another week to fight for the Gold Champions Trophy. There were also daily prizes, which were similar to the prizes on the regular version of the show, however, they were mainly gold, rather than the turquoise-blue colour. In Series 6, there were also special "Redemption" weeks with four previous losing contestants who had never won a day prize.

Each day, a week's worth of shows are recorded, so the celebrities are booked for only one day, changing outfits between shows.

Games

Buzzer games
Rhyme Time (first played on Series 1, Episode 1): The players are shown two statements whose answers rhyme. They then buzz in with the correct answers. On some questions, one of the statements is replaced with either a picture or a song (in which the title of the song is the rhyming answer they require). This is usually the first round of the week to ease the contestants into the format.

Broken Karaoke (first played on Series 1, Episode 1): The "House of Games" fictional karaoke machine is broken and can only show the first letters of each word of a particular song. The players must buzz in when they know the answer. The only clues that the players get are the year that the song was released or the genre of the song (first seen in Series 4) and that the letters come up in time with the tune of the song. From Series 2 onward, if the song has not been correctly guessed by the time the letters are filled in, the initial letters of each word of the title are also provided as an additional clue.

What's in a Name? (changed to It's All In The Name in Series 2) (first played on Series 1, Episode 2 (Series 2, Episode 9 as It's All In The Name)): The players are given statements, the answer to which can be made using the letters from the full name of a particular player. Each player has two answers come from their name and a point is given for a correct answer, but if the player gets a correct answer from their own name, they get two points.

This Round Is in Code (first played on Series 1, Episode 3): The players are given a category, and answers are shown in alpha-numeric code (1=A, 2=B, 3=C, etc.). The players have to unscramble the codes to get a point.

Z–A (first played on Series 1, Episode 4): The players are shown three blanked out words with the letters filled in reverse alphabetical order (Z, then Y, then X, etc.). The players have to buzz in when they know what connects all three words.

Games House Of (first played on Series 2, Episode 3): The players are given questions, but instead of answering them normally, they have to give the answer with the words in alphabetical order. For example, Sacha Baron Cohen stars alongside Pamela Anderson as the title character in what 2006 comedy film? The answer is Borat: Cultural Learnings of America for Make Benefit Glorious Nation of Kazakhstan. However, in this round, they would give the answer as "America Benefit Borat: Cultural for Glorious Kazakhstan Learnings Make Nation of of".

The Elephant in the Room (first played on Series 2, Episode 4): The players are given a word, and are then given questions to answer, but instead of answering them normally, they have to give the answer with the given word removed from the answer. For example, if the given word was "ham" and the answer to the question was Hammersmith, the player would have to say "mersmith" as the answer.

Roonerspisms (first played on Series 2, Episode 5): Same as Rhyme Time except that, rather than the answers rhyming, they are spoonerisms of each other. For example, a statement could say "Surname of Richie Rich's minder, portrayed by Ade Edmondson" and the other one say "Hat referred to in Scotland as a bunnet", then the answers would be "Catflap" and "Flat cap".

The Backwards Round (first played on Series 2, Episode 6): The players are given questions, but the words are in reverse order (buzzers on fingers). As with the questions, the players must give their answers in reverse. As an example for "Duo mouse and cat which created Barbera Joseph and Hanna William?", the answer would be Jerry and Tom (with the correct way round being "William Hanna and Joseph Barbera created which cat and mouse duo?" Tom and Jerry). Some questions involve the identification of songs played backwards (often with Richard asking "Song this of title the is what?").

Opposites Attract (first played on Series 2, Episode 14): The players are given a category and a clue, and they have to work out what the answer relating to the category is, which is the opposite of the clue that they have just been given. Some opposites may be more cryptic than others. For example, if the category were rock bands, and the clue were "Green Cold China Georges", then the answer would be Red Hot Chili Peppers, as red is in the opposite side of the colour wheel from green, hot is the opposite of cold, Chile is on the opposite side of the world from China and George is the brother of Peppa in the show Peppa Pig.

King of the Jumble (first played on Series 3, Episode 9): Same as Rhyme Time except that, rather than the answers rhyming, they are anagrams of each other.

Two Clues in One (first played on Series 3, Episode 9): The players are given a category and are then given a clue to an answer related to that category, which has the same initials as the answer.

A Blast From The Past Tense (first played on Series 3, Episode 12): The players are given a question, but they must give the answer in the past tense. For example, if the answer to a question was "Take That", the players must give the answer "Took That", as 'took' is the past tense of 'take'.

Internet History (first played on Series 3, Episode 19): In this round, the contestants are asked to identify a historical figure using fictionalised hashtags relating to their role in history. Contestants get a point for each correct answer.

Pop Art (first played on Series 3, Episode 21): After being given the year the song was released, the players are shown four picture clues representing a lyric from a popular song and must buzz in with the title.

Can You Feel It? (first played on Series 3, Episode 25): Each of the players is given a magnetic board with a word spelled on it (all the same word). The players are then blindfolded with their board facing towards the screen. Osman gives them a question and they have to spell out the answer using the letters on their boards. The first person to hit the buzzer with the correct answer wins a point.

The Too Complicated Round (first played on Series 3, Episode 49): The players are given a category which they have to give a correct example of, but the question has nothing to do with the category. Instead, the players have to buzz in with the right answer relating to the category which has the same initials as the answer to the question. For example, if the category was Doctor Who actors, and the question was "Who was the first host of Have I Got News for You following the sacking of Angus Deayton?", the players would have to answer with Paul McGann, as he has the same initials as the answer to the question: Paul Merton. This game is only played on a "Champions Week".

Well Done If You Said That at Home (first played on Series 4, Episode 2): The players are shown a word cloud based on something like a film, TV show or book title, generated from a home viewer survey asking for three words they would associate with the title. The cloud is revealed to the players from the least popular word to the most popular. The players must buzz in with the correct title for a point. The title of this round is a reference to Osman's other quiz show, Pointless, which is based on home-viewer surveys.

Sorry, Wrong Number (first played on Series 4, Episode 6): The players are given an instruction and a clue to an answer with a number in it. Players must buzz in with the answer correctly modified by the instruction. For example, if the instruction was "Multiply by 10" with the clue "Official residence of the UK Prime Minister", the answer the players should give is "100 Downing Street".

There Once Was A Quiz Host Called Richard... (first played on Series 4, Episode 7): The players are given the lines to a limerick, one line at a time. They must buzz in when they have worked out who or what the limerick is about. They must buzz in with the correct answer for a point.

Vowel Movement (first played on Series 4, Episode 9): The players are given a list of up to four items, one at a time, however all of the vowels have been changed. They must buzz in with the category that links the correctly spelled items for a point.

Singonyms (first played on Series 5, Episode 11): The players are given a set of song lyrics where all words have been replaced with synonyms of the original words. Players are also provided the year that the song was released. They must buzz in with the title of the song to earn a point.

Richard's Junk (first played on Series 5, Episode 17): At the start of the round, all players are shown a picture of some of Osman's various junk items. Players are given 15 seconds to memorise the items before the picture disappears. Players are then asked a series of questions for which the answer is one of the items in the picture (often in a punning way). They must buzz in with the correct answer to earn a point. After each question, the relevant item is revealed and is not used in future questions in that round. After all questions are asked, the first player to buzz in and name all items in the picture that were not used earns a bonus point. The game was named Santa's Junk for Festive House of Games, with the items being presented in person by Father Christmas.

Sounds Like... (first played on Series 5, Episode 20): All players are shown a category and a set of pictures of things that, when combined in order, sound like something in the category. The first player to buzz in with the correct answer earns a point.

Only Fools And Zebras (first played on Series 6, Episode 17): Players are shown a category. A question is asked, which will have an answer from that category as part of the answer. A picture is also shown, containing a picture from the category. The player must answer the question, but substituting the picture in place of the part of the question from the category.

Double Trouble (first played on Series 6, Episode 35): Players are given a letter. They are then given two clues to things which each have a word that starts with that letter. They have to say the word of each answer that starts with the letter to earn a point.

It Will All Become Clear (first played on Series 6, Episode 93): Players are given a blurry still from a movie. The still "buffers" to become clearer over time. They must buzz in with the name of the movie to get the point.

Individual games
Correction Centre (first played on Series 1, Episode 2): The players are shown statements in which one word is incorrect and needs to be amended. Each player gets their own statements, and get a point for each correct answer, but an incorrect answer opens the statement to everyone else to buzz in.

Mouse of Games (first played on Series 1, Episode 4): The players are given a series of clues to films, TV shows, novels, etc. in which a single letter has been changed from the original title. Each clue is a short description of the would-be newly titled work and the player must give the altered title. For films, the year of release of the original film is also given.

The Answer's in the Question (first played on Series 1, Episode 5): The players are shown a statement based on a category. Part of it is in capitals, that need to be rearranged to create an answer that is relevant to the category in question and described by the statement.

And The Answer Isn't (first played on Series 1, Episode 5): Each player is given a question with four possible answers. One is correct, but the other three are false, created by the celebrities who are not answering this question. They need to find the correct answer for a point, but if they choose a false answer, the player who created the false answer chosen gets a point themselves.

Cine-Nyms (first played on Series 1, Episode 7): The players are shown a quote from a film, but all its words have been replaced with synonyms of the actual words used. They need to work out the film for a point.

Highbrow Lowbrow (first played on Series 2, Episode 2): The players are given two questions with the same answer; however, one of them is highbrow (a more academic question) and the other is lowbrow (a more pop culture question). If they get the question right after the highbrow clue, they get two points; however, they only receive one point if they get the question correct after the lowbrow clue. If they fail to answer the lowbrow question correctly, other players may buzz in with the answer for one point.

The Pen-Ultimate Round (first played on Series 2, Episode 10): The players are each given two statements, which are claimed to be the opening lines to a piece of writing, such as a book, poem or speech. One is the correct answer and the other is a made-up statement by one of the other three contestants who is not answering the question. The players get a point for the statement if they guess correctly, but if they get it wrong, the person who made the statement gets a point instead. This round is the actual penultimate round of the week.

Question Writers' Day Off (first played on Series 3, Episode 8): Each player is asked to pick a question from a choice of 8 written by the children (their names and ages are given) of the question writers (who have conveniently been given a day off by Richard), and they get a point for giving the correct answer.

House of Gamers (first played on Series 3, Episode 44): Same as Mouse of Games except that, instead of changing a letter in each original title, an extra letter is inserted.

Hose of Games (first played on Series 3, Episode 48): Same as Mouse of Games except that a letter in each original title is removed rather than changed.

Hey, Alexander! (first played on Series 4, Episode 2): The players are shown a board of eight categories. Each player chooses one category, and a statement is then read by the voice of Alexander Armstrong. The player must determine if the statement is true or false for one point. Armstrong and Osman both work on fellow quiz show Pointless. The title of the round is a multi-layer pun; Armstrong is represented in-show as a virtual assistant based on an Amazon Echo, while "Hey Alexander" refers both to common wake words such as "Hello Siri" and Armstrong's role as narrator of Hey Duggee.

Look Who's Back (first played on Series 4, Episode 8): Each player is asked to pick a question from a choice of four written by previous House of Games players (their names and silhouettes are given) and they get a point for giving the correct answer.

Hidden in Plain Sight (first played on Series 4, Episode 14): The players are shown a statement based on a category. There is also a certain string of letters in the statement that spell out, in their entirety, the answer to the category description. These strings of letters can be inside of one word or can overlap through several words. The player must identify the answer and where the answer is spelled out in the question for the point.

Klaus of Games (first played on Series 6, Episode 12): Same as Mouse of Games except that, instead of changing a letter in each original title, one word is changed to something that rhymes with the original word.

Pairs games
Note: All pairs games are played in the second round, and on each show, the person who is in last place after the first round gets to choose which of the other celebrities they want to be their partner for this round.  if However, if 2, 3 or all 4 players are tied in last place, there is no formal tiebreaker (e.g. whoever is sitting closest to Richard gets to decide); instead, Richard will just choose a player at random

Distinctly Average (first played on Series 1, Episode 1): The pairs are given questions for which they must write numeric answers on their tablet computers, and the average of both their answers is taken as their team answer; the closest pair to the correct answer win themselves a point. Usually played on Mondays as the second round of the week.

Build Your Own Question (first played on Series 1, Episode 2): The pairs are given a left and a right hand set of options; one member chooses from the left and one chooses from the right. The choices chosen are then used to make a question, to which a correct answer gives each player a point.

Dim Sums (first played on Series 1, Episode 4): The pairs are given an equation (e.g. ? × ? = 18). The pairs are then given four questions with numeric answers, and must choose two that produce the correct answer. A correct sum earns the players a point.

Chron-Illogical (first played on Series 2, Episode 1): The pairs are given three statements which they have to put in chronological order. They all have a loose theme, and one of the statements is about one of the two contestants not in the pair answering the question. The team members get a point each if they put the statements in the correct order.

You Complete Me (first played on Series 2, Episode 8): The pairs are given a question which has a two word answer. One of the players in a pair buzzes in with the first word of the answer and then the other player in the pair has to give the second word for them both to get a point.

All in the Details (first played on Series 2, Episode 9): Before the show, each player answers questions about specific details of a book, film, etc, based on three statements with the key part of the statement left for the players to fill in themselves. Their partner must identify the subject from the answers.

Venn Will I Be Famous? (first played on Series 2, Episode 17): Each pair is given the names of three famous people and two statements. They must select the one person to whom both statements apply. For example, if the people were Michael Jackson, Nicolas Cage and Mr. Blobby, and the statements were "I have had a UK Christmas No. 1 in the 90s" and "I have married Elvis's daughter Lisa Marie Presley", then the person who fits both would be Michael Jackson, as Mr. Blobby only fits the first one, and Nicolas Cage only fits the second one.

You Spell Terrible (first played on Series 3, Episode 2): The pairs are given a question which one player must buzz in to say the correct answer, and the other player must spell it out correctly to get a point.

Totes Emoji (first played on Series 3, Episode 3): Each player is asked to identify an answer based on a category chosen which one of their opponents has described in emoji before the show.

The Two Wrongies (first played on Series 3, Episode 43): All the players are asked general knowledge questions before the show, and the players in each pair have to guess what wrong answer was said by their teammates to the questions they answered incorrectly. The name of the round alludes to the comedy double act The Two Ronnies.

I Complete You (first played on Series 3, Episode 45): The pairs are given a question which has a two word answer. In a reverse to You Complete Me, one of the players in a pair buzzes in with the second word of the answer, and then the other player in the pair has to give the first word for them both to get a point.

Reichard Ösmans Haus Der Spiele (changed to Reichard Ösmanns Haus Der Spiele in Series 4) (first played on Series 3, Episode 50): The pairs choose from a list of categories in different languages, and are given a multiple-choice question in that language. They choose which of the three possible answers (also in the said foreign language) is the correct one.

The Z-List (first played on Series 3, Episode 55): The pairs are given a category and have to write down a correct answer between them. The team who goes furthest down the alphabet (nearest to Z) wins a point each, and if the team gives the answer that is the furthest possible, they get 2 points each.

Don't State The Obvious (first played on Series 4, Episode 5): Each person in turn is given something they must describe to their partner by writing down three words. If the partner guesses correctly, the team scores a point. However, both the opposing pair also get to write down 3 words. If any of their words match with the describer's words, they block them from getting a point.

Password123 (first played on Series 4, Episode 15): Each team is asked to pick from a choice of four celebrities, and are asked to guess their "password", which is a combination of the answer of two questions about the said person. They have three guesses to get the password correctly, but after each incorrect guess, Richard will tell them if they have got either of the questions right (without saying which, if one is correct).

Stick It (first played on Series 4, Episode 18): Each player is given 30 seconds to draw a person (possibly a fictional character) as a stick figure, and their teammate has to guess who the person is supposed to be.

My Perfect Match (first played on Series 5, Episode 5): Each pair is shown two characteristics that Osman claims he is looking for in his perfect match, along with two celebrities. They must select the celebrity with both shown characteristics to earn a point.

Mime Time (first played on Series 6, Episode 25): Each player is given a question, and they have to mime the answer to their partner.

Random games
Is It Me? (first played on Series 1, Episode 1): Each team member is given a card with something specific on it. Osman asks questions and each player must raise their card up if they think that the answer on the card is a correct answer to the question, and lower their card if they do not think it relates to it.

The Nice Round (first played on Series 2, Episode 3): A category is given and each player gets given an individual question. The other three players are given the answer on a card, and have to write down a word on their tablet, which they think would give the answer to what is on the card, without mentioning anything to do with what is on the card. The player trying to guess the answer can then nominate players to get a point for giving a good clue.

But What's The Question? (first played on Series 3, Episode 4): A list of four answers is provided at the start of the round, and each player is given one answer chosen by an opponent. They are then shown three questions and must pick the one which leads to that answer.

Lucky Dip (first played on Series 3, Episode 11): A bag of four balls numbered 1 to 4 is given to players, who must each pick a ball (from left to right, as seen on the screen), and the person who picks ball number 1 gets the first chance to answer, the person who picks ball number 2 gets the second chance to answer, etc. A list of four answers is provided for each question, and the order of answering continues until the correct answer is given.

Win When They're Singing (first played on Series 3, Episode 16): The players hear the introduction to a well-known song, then, after a few seconds, it is faded out. They need to buzz in when they think the first word is sung in that particular song to win themselves a point.

The (Not Quite So) Nice Round (first played on Series 3, Episode 44): A category is given and each player gets given an individual question. The other three players are given the answer on a card and have to write down a word on their tablet, which they think would give the answer to what is on the card, without mentioning anything to do with what is on the card. Unlike The Nice Round, the player trying to guess the answer can also nominate players to get a point deducted for giving a bad clue.

Who Goes First? (first played on Series 3, Episode 98): A question with four options is shown, but to decide who gets to the answer the question first, another question is asked to the contestants, such as "How many pets have you owned?", and the contestant who has the highest to that answer gets to go first, and if they get the question right, they get the point. If they get it wrong, the next person down gets the same question with three choices left and it carries on going down until someone gets it right.

There's No 'I' in Osman (first played on Series 4, Episode 47): The players are made to stand up and, in turn, offer a correct answer to a category which Osman gives. Their answers must not contain a certain letter, for example "Monopoly spaces without an 'I. If a player fails to give Osman a correct answer, they sit down. The last player standing wins a point.

I Am Not A Robot (first played on Series 5, Episode 6): Each player in turn is shown a picture divided into squares, resembling a CAPTCHA. They must select all squares fulfilling a particular condition (and no other squares) to earn a point.

Tom, Vic and Abby (first played on Series 6, Episode 11): The players are shown three different questions written by three different question writers, which share a common answer. They must identify the correct answer to all three questions.

Tablet games
Put Your Finger on It (first played on Series 1, Episode 2): The players are given a picture question and have to point out who or what they think is the correct answer (it could be a specific person or an unusual item). Everyone plays on their own tablet.

Where Is Kazakhstan? (first played on Series 1, Episode 3): The players are given a map of a certain part of the world on their tablets. They are given a question and have to point on their map where they think it is. The closest to the correct place wins a point.

The Rich List (first played on Series 1, Episode 4): The players have to write down an answer that is correct based on a statement given by the computer (there are multiple correct answers to each question). The players only get points for a correct answer that no other player chose, but as an added twist, Osman will also write down an answer to make it even harder.

Size Matters (first played on Series 2, Episode 2): The players are given a category and have to write down a correct answer relating to the category. The player who gives the correct response with the most letters in the answer wins a point, and they get a bonus point if the correct answer is the longest possible answer.

I'm Terrible At Dating (first played on Series 2, Episode 5): The players have to write down what they think the answer is to a question to which the answer is a year. The player who is closest to the correct answer gets a point, but if anyone gets the year exactly right, they then get two points.

Outplay Osman (first played on Series 3, Episode 39): The players have to write down one of the possible answers to a question. Osman then gives as many answers as he can think of in 30 seconds, and any player with a correct answer that he has not given gets a point.

Final round
Answer Smash: The teams are given a category and a picture relating to that category appears on the screen. Below the picture is a general knowledge question. The players have to "smash" the answers together to create one answer. (E.g. if given a picture of Mr. Stink and a question whose answer is Tinky Winky, the answer the players would have to give is "Mr. Stinky Winky".) A point is given for each correct answer, but a point is deducted for an incorrect answer; it is therefore possible to finish a day's worth of games on negative points (though this has only happened twice). If there is a tie for first place at the end of Answer Smash, one additional question is played with only the tied players taking part. In some Series 4 episodes, broadcast in 2021, all of Series 5 in 2022, and Series 6 in 2022-23, the question was shown first, followed by the picture, and the answers had to be smashed together in that order.

Daily prizes
On each day, the celebrities play for "daily prizes", which, as explained above, are regular everyday items with the show's logo on them. Each day has its own set of prizes, which were as follows:

Contestants
Weekly winners in bold.

Series 1
Week 1 (4–8 September 2017): Nish Kumar, Anneka Rice, Clara Amfo and Al Murray
Week 2 (11–15 September 2017): Angela Scanlon, Clive Myrie, Sara Pascoe and Rick Edwards
Week 3 (18–22 September 2017): Anita Rani, Chris Ramsey, Janet Ellis and Jamie Theakston

Series 2
Week 1 (28 May–1 June 2018): Naga Munchetty, Jordan Stephens, Sally Lindsay and David O'Doherty
Week 2 (4–8 June 2018): Ellie Taylor, Steve Pemberton, Fern Britton and Josh Widdicombe
Week 3 (11–15 June 2018): Shappi Khorsandi, Michael Buerk, Amanda Abbington and Elis James
Week 4 (18, 20, 20–22 June 2018): Beattie Edmondson, Amol Rajan, Gaby Roslin and Hugh Dennis
Week 5 (25–29 June 2018): Chizzy Akudolu, Charlie Higson, Kate Williams and Tom Allen
Week 6 (12–16 November 2018): Rachel Riley, JB Gill, Katie Derham and Richard Herring
Week 7 (19–23 November 2018): Lolly Adefope, Dan Walker, Sarah Greene and Miles Jupp
Week 8 (26–30 November 2018): Samantha Womack, Rory Reid, Anne Diamond and James Acaster
Week 9 (3–8 December 2018): Kelly Cates, Tyger Drew-Honey, Desiree Burch and Matt Allwright
Week 10 (10–14 December 2018): Susie Dent, Nick Owen, Chemmy Alcott and Dane Baptiste

Series 3
Week 1 (7–11 October 2019): Miquita Oliver, Ed Gamble, Kate Thornton and Adrian Edmondson
Week 2 (14–18 October 2019): Scarlett Moffatt, Iain Stirling, Angellica Bell and Gyles Brandreth
Week 3 (21–25 October 2019): Kate Humble, Ivo Graham, Andi Oliver and Phill Jupitus
Week 4 (28 October–1 November 2019): June Sarpong, Dev Griffin, Debbie McGee and Alex Horne
Week 5 (4–8 November 2019): Nina Wadia, Johnny Ball, Suzi Ruffell and Danny Wallace
Week 6 (11–15 November 2019): Jay Blades, Rachel Parris, Shaun Keaveny and Jan Ravens (tie between Parris and Ravens)
Week 7 (18–22 November 2019): Kate Bottley, John Thomson, YolanDa Brown and Joel Dommett
Week 8 (25–29 November 2019): Charlene White, Gregg Wallace, Holly Walsh and Chris Hollins
Week 9 (6–10 January 2020): Rose Matafeo, Rav Wilding, Valerie Singleton and Gary Delaney
Week 10 (13–17 January 2020): Andrea McLean, Phil Wang, Rita Simons and Adil Ray
Week 11 (20–24 January 2020): Michelle Ackerley, Matt Forde, Judy Murray and Fred MacAulay
Week 12 (27–31 January 2020): Kerry Godliman, Radzi Chinyanganya, Ebony Rainford-Brent and Hal Cruttenden
Week 13 (3–7 February 2020): Lou Sanders, Richard Coles, Maggie Aderin-Pocock and Stuart Maconie
Week 14 (10–14 February 2020): Vick Hope, Gethin Jones, Nicki Chapman and Tim Vine
Week 15 (17–21 February 2020): Gareth Malone, Jamelia, Paul Martin and Susan Calman
Week 16 (24–28 February 2020): Samira Ahmed, John Robins, Angela Rippon and Dom Joly

Series 4
Week 1 (12–16 October 2020): Vikki Stone, Ade Adepitan, Jean Johansson and Stephen Mangan
Week 2 (19–23 October 2020): Mike Bushell, Aisling Bea, Sunetra Sarker and Dion Dublin
Week 3 (26–30 October 2020): Scott Mills, Josie d'Arby, Jayde Adams and Rufus Hound
Week 4 (2–6 November 2020): AJ Odudu, Neil Delamere, Mark Billingham and Lucy Porter
Week 5 (9–13 November 2020): Meera Syal, Steve Backshall, Catherine Bohart and Ranj Singh
Week 6 (16–20 November 2020): Melvin Odoom, Denise Van Outen, Greg Rutherford and Angela Barnes 
Week 7 (23–27 November 2020): Denise Lewis, Rhys James, Isy Suttie and David James
Week 8 (30 November–4 December 2020): Sara Barron, Rickie Haywood-Williams, Jessica Fostekew and Anton Du Beke
Week 9 (7–11 December 2020): Alex Jones, Karim Zeroual, Jessica Knappett and Robert Rinder
Week 10 (14–17 and 20 December 2020): Steve Cram, Josie Long, Jeanette Kwakye and Lloyd Griffith
Week 11 (4–8 January 2021): Gabby Logan, Tim Key, Gemma Cairney and Jeff Stelling
Week 12 (11–15 January 2021): Alex Brooker, Sophie Duker, Charlotte Hawkins and David Baddiel
Week 13 (18–22 January 2021): Maisie Adam, Rory Bremner, Michelle Gayle and James Cracknell
Week 14 (25–29 January 2021): Charlie Brooks, Darren Harriott, Melinda Messenger and Les Dennis  (tie between Messenger and Dennis)
Week 15 (1–5 February 2021): Josie Lawrence, Raj Bisram, Laura Whitmore and Mark Watson
Week 16 (8–12 February 2021): Kae Kurd, Zoe Lyons, Andrew Hunter Murray and Kate Robbins
Week 17 (15–19 February 2021): Sindhu Vee, Tom Rosenthal, Anna Richardson and Marcus Brigstocke
Week 18 (22–26 February 2021): Colin Murray, Sally Phillips, Nathan Caton and Ronni Ancona
Week 19 (1–5 March 2021): Mae Martin, Nihal Arthanayake, Patsy Kensit and Jake Humphrey
Week 20 (8–12 March 2021): Glenn Moore, Mina Anwar, Kiri Pritchard-McLean and Shaun Williamson

Series 5
Week 1 (16, 18–20, 20 August 2021): Gareth Thomas, Olga Koch, Reeta Chakrabarti and Andrew Maxwell
Week 2 (23–27 August 2021): Jamali Maddix, Jodie Kidd, Suzi Perry and Hugh Fearnley-Whittingstall
Week 3 (30–31 August, 2–3, 3 September 2021): Joe Thomas, Lucy Beaumont, Jake Wood and Shazia Mirza
Week 4 (6–8, 10, 10 September 2021): Kevin Clifton, Kemah Bob, Victoria Derbyshire and JJ Chalmers
Week 5 (13–17 September 2021): Philip Glenister, Thanyia Moore, Mark Chapman and Kaye Adams
Week 6 (20–24 September 2021): Matthew Pinsent, Ruby Bhogal, Ingrid Oliver and Ed Byrne 
Week 7 (27 September–1 October 2021): Cariad Lloyd, Dennis Taylor, Yasmine Akram and Geoff Norcott
Week 8 (4–8 October 2021): Jo Brand, Roger Black, Tiff Stevenson and Sanjeev Kohli
Week 9 (11–15 October 2021): Andy Hamilton, Sabrina Grant, Kirsty Wark and Matt Edmondson  
Week 10 (18–22 October 2021): Joanne McNally, Bill Turnbull, Michelle Collins and Reginald D. Hunter
Week 11 (25–29 October 2021): Sean Fletcher, Kimberly Wyatt, Louise Minchin and Chris Washington
Week 12 (1–5 November 2021): Sarah Millican, Nabil Abdulrashid, Philippa Perry and Luke Kempner
Week 13 (8–12 November 2021): Mike Wozniak, Clare Balding, Mehreen Baig and Jamie Laing
Week 14 (15–19 November 2021): Will Kirk, Edith Bowman, Fern Brady and Martin Lewis
Week 15 (22–26 November 2021): Athena Kugblenu, Nick Helm, Nina Conti and Toby Tarrant
Week 16 (29 November–3 December 2021): Jessie Cave, AJ Pritchard, Ayesha Hazarika and Simon Hickson
Week 17 (7–11 March 2022): Jennie McAlpine, Felicity Ward, Joe Pasquale and Ugo Monye
Week 18 (14–19 March 2022): Jen Brister, Kelvin Fletcher, Zoe Williams and Ian Moore
Week 19 (21–25 March 2022): Stephen Bailey, Crystelle Pereira, Amanda Lamb and Nick Moran
Week 20 (28 March–1 April 2022): Carol Smillie, Babatunde Aléshé, Richie Anderson and Jo Caulfield
Week 21 (4–8 April 2022): Briony May Williams, Milton Jones, Ria Lina and Martin Roberts
Week 22 (11–15 April 2022): Martel Maxwell, Mathew Horne, Chloe Petts and Alex Beresford
Week 23 (18–22 April 2022): Kimberley Nixon, Rachel Fairburn, Trevor Nelson and Des Clarke
Week 24 (25–29 April 2022): Jay McGuiness, Linda Robson, Sarah Kendall and Bobby Seagull

Series 6
 Week 1 (5–7 and 9–10 September 2022): Hannah Cockroft, Neil Morrissey, Penny Smith and Rhys Stephenson
 Week 2 (12 and 14–17 September 2022): Rob Deering, Katya Jones, Jayne Middlemiss and Phil Tufnell
 Week 3 (19–23 September 2022): Charlie Baker, Val McDermid, Martin Offiah and Rebecca Lucy Taylor
 Week 4 (26–30 September 2022): Eddie Kadi, Natasha Raskin Sharp, Charlie Stayt and Faye Tozer
 Week 5 (3–7 October 2022): Joe Sugg, Kerry Howard, Evelyn Mok and Toby Anstis
 Week 6 (10–14 October 2022): Roo Irvine, Claire Richards, John Kearns and Diarmuid Gavin
 Week 7 (17–21 October 2022): Cally Beaton, Louis Emerick, Helen George and Justin Moorhouse
 Week 8 (5–9 December 2022): Ashley John-Baptiste, Simon Rimmer, Claire Sweeney and Esme Young
 Week 9 (12–16 December 2022): Kevin Eldon, Sarah Keyworth, Laila Rouass and John Whaite
 Week 10 (2–6 January 2023): Adrian Chiles, Greg McHugh, Sukh Ojla and Jayne Sharp
 Week 11 (9–13 January 2023): Jasmine Harman, Jason Mohammad, Suzannah Lipscomb and Dave Johns 
 Week 12 (16–20 January 2023): Grace Dent, Lauren Steadman, Kriss Akabusi and Tim Lovejoy 
 Week 13 (23–27 January 2023): Harriet Kemsley, Laurence Llewelyn-Bowen, Verona Rose and Jon Culshaw
 Week 14 (30 January–3 February 2023): Kirsten O'Brien, Christine Ohuruogu, Mike Bubbins and Kai Widdrington

House of Champions
Series 3
House of Champions Week 1 (2–5 and 7 December 2019): Scarlett Moffatt, Rick Edwards, Naga Munchetty and David O'Doherty
House of Champions Week 2 (9–13 December 2019): June Sarpong, Richard Herring, Kate Williams and Dane Baptiste
House of Champions Week 3 (2–6 March 2020): Chizzy Akudolu, Miles Jupp, Ellie Taylor and Amol Rajan
House of Champions Week 4 (9–13 March 2020): Holly Walsh, Nish Kumar, Sarah Greene and Hugh Dennis
Series 5
House of Champions Week 1 (6–10 December 2021): Vikki Stone, Sally Phillips, Rickie Haywood-Williams and Dan Walker
House of Champions Week 2 (13–17 December 2021): Maisie Adam, Dev Griffin, Ivo Graham and Zoe Lyons
House of Champions Week 3 (21–25 February 2022): Beattie Edmondson, Adrian Edmondson, Kemah Bob and Angela Barnes
House of Champions Week 4 (28 February–4 March 2022): Sara Barron, Gregg Wallace, Sanjeev Kohli and Josie Long
Series 6
House of Champions Week 1 (7–11 November 2022): Laura Whitmore, Tim Key, Sunetra Sarker and Jamie Laing
House of Champions Week 2 (14–18 November 2022): Yasmine Akram, Stephen Mangan, Ingrid Oliver and Tom Rosenthal
House of Champions Week 3 (21–25 November 2022): Maggie Aderin-Pocock, Cariad Lloyd, Gareth Malone and Mike Wozniak
House of Champions Week 4 (28 November–2 December 2022): Stephen Bailey, Charlie Brooks, Ria Lina and John Thomson

Redemption Week
Redemption Week Week 1 (24–28 October 2022): Radzi Chinyanganya, Janet Ellis, Darren Harriott and Suzi Ruffell
Redemption Week Week 2 (31 October–4 November 2022): Sian Gibson, Jean Johansson, Iain Stirling and Rav Wilding

Festive
Festive House of Games Week 1 (19–23 December 2022): Clare Balding, Ivo Graham, Ugo Monye and Su Pollard
Festive House of Games Week 2 (26–30 December 2022): Brian Conley, Scarlett Moffatt, Anneka Rice and Phil Wang (tie between Moffatt and Rice)

Transmissions

Spin-offs

Richard Osman's House of Games Night
On 20 November 2020, Osman launched a five-episode spin-off called Richard Osman's House of Games Night, broadcast weekly in primetime on BBC One. A one-episode Christmas Special aired on 28 December 2020. A second series, consisting of six episodes, began on 1 October 2021.

The series follows the exact same format as the main show, but with the addition of rounds not seen in the original. There are no double points in the final episode. Series 2 features a house band led by David O'Doherty.

New games
Don't Cry For Me Guatemala (first played on Series 1, Episode 1, Round 3): The players are given a question before the show in which the answer is (unknown to them) part of the lyrics of a well-known song. A live band then sings the song and cuts to the answers given by each player to see if they have completed it.

Don't Trust The Experts (only played on Series 1, Episode 2, Round 4): Two experts give each player a fact in their area of expertise. Only one of these facts is true, which the player has to determine.

Clash In The Attic (only played on Series 1, Episode 3, Round 4): The players are given questions before the show and must find an object in the House of Games attic that provides the answers to the questions. The title is a pun on the reality show Cash in the Attic.

Sounding Off (only played on Series 1, Episode 4, Round 2): The players must guess the historical event that their teammate is recreating using Foley art.

This Music Round's Better With You (only played on Series 1, Episode 5, Round 3): Each player in turn is asked to pick from a choice of 8 categories. A live band then asks a question in that category in the form of an original song in which the final lyric, the answer to the question, is missing. The player must correctly answer the question to earn a point. The title is a pun on the 1998 Stardust hit "Music Sounds Better with You".

Is There A Doctor In The House Of Games? (first played on Series 2, Episode 1, Round 1): Each player in turn is asked a question with an obscure answer. One member of the live audience will know that answer, and Osman will give a qualification of the audience member who knows the answer. The player must identify the audience member who knows the answer. If they do this successfully, they earn a point. Otherwise, any other player can buzz in and try to take the point.

I've Got The Historical Blues (first played on Series 2, Episode 1, Round 2): David O'Doherty has the "historical blues" and he represents this by singing original songs played by the live band. O'Doherty sings each player in turn a song whose lyrics reference a historical event (Group 1) or figure (Group 2), with the final lyric being of the form "I've got the (event or figure) blues". Just before this lyric, the song stops, and the player must name the event or figure. If they do this successfully, they earn a point; otherwise, any other player can buzz in and try to take the point. Unusually for a game played in Round 2, this game is not a pairs game.

Arty-Facts (only played on Series 2, Episode 1, Round 3): This is a pairs game. Before the show, each player is asked to represent something in a given category with a work of art in a particular medium. In the show, each player in turn is shown their partner's work, and they must identify what the work represents. If they are successful, they and their partner earn a point; otherwise, the other pair can make a guess and try to take the point.

It's Not Me, It's You (first played in Series 2, Episode 2, Round 2): Each pair in turn selects one of two pairs of categories. The two contestants then sit in front of the screen, with a divider preventing them from seeing each other. Each contestant is given a paddle with one of the categories written on it. Osman then gives a series of statements to which one of the two categories apply. For an answer to be considered correct, the contestant with the correct category must raise their paddle and the contestant without the correct category must keep theirs lowered. Giving a correct answer results in Osman moving on to the next statement. Giving an incorrect answer, both or neither contestants raising the paddles or taking too long to give an answer results in Osman declaring "incorrect" (without specifying why) and returning to the first statement. The pair have 90 seconds to give correct answers to as many unique statements as they can. They earn one point for each unique statement they gave a correct answer to.

Get Your Head In The Game (first played in Series 2, Episode 2, Round 4): Each contestant in turn stands behind the screen. The screen displays a live video feed of the contestant, with their face replaced by something else (which may or may not be the face of a famous person). Each of the other contestants provides a one-word clue as to what the contestant "is", after which the contestant must guess who they "are". If they are correct, they earn a point. Similarly to The Nice Round, they can also give a point to the opponent who wrote the best clue.

Here's One You Asked Yourself Earlier (only played on Series 2, Episode 3, Round 1): Before the show, each player is asked to ask a question backwards. In the show, each player in turn is shown a video of them asking their question backwards, then that video is played backwards twice. If the player gives the correct answer, they earn a point; otherwise, any other player can buzz in and try to take the point.

Famous Last Words (first played on Series 2, Episode 3, Round 2): David O'Doherty remembers some events of a book (Group 1) or objects (Group 2), but he cannot remember the book's title or object's name. O'Doherty sings each player in turn a song whose lyrics reference some events or objects, with the final lyric being the book's title or object's name. Just before this lyric, the song stops and the player must name the title of the book or objects. If they do this successfully, they earn a point; otherwise, any other player can buzz in and try to take the point. Unusually for a game played in Round 2, this game is not a pairs game.

Get Your Junk Out (first played on Series 2, Episode 3, Round 4): This round is played in exactly the same way as Richard's Junk from the regular show. However, instead of the junk items being shown on the screen, ten members of the audience physically hold up the junk items for the contestants to see (during the 15-second memorisation period and when the items are given as correct answers).

Weigh Up Your Options (only played on Series 2, Episode 4, Round 4): Each pair must estimate the weight of an object by using several items provided from the trolley. The pair whose item's weight is closest to the actual weight of the object win themselves a point.

Coming Up Next... (only played on Series 2, Episode 5, Round 4): This round is played in exactly the same way as All in the Details from the regular show. However, in each subject, there are four statements to be filled in instead of three and then those filled-in statements are read as a script by a famous TV/radio personality via video tape (he/she also knows the subject).

Altered rules of previous games
Answer Smash: The teams are given a category and a picture relating to that category appears on the screen. But unlike the regular version, the picture is below the general knowledge question. The players have to "smash" the answers together to create one answer. (E.g. if the answer to the question was Claudia Winkleman and the picture was Manfred Mann, the answer the players would have to give is "Claudia Winklemanfred Mann".) A point is given for a correct answer, but a point is deducted for an incorrect answer.

Contestants
Series 1: Jennifer Saunders, Jermaine Jenas, Roisin Conaty and Jason Manford
Christmas Special: Sarah Hadland, Alex Horne, Charlene White and Craig Revel Horwood
Series 2, Group 1: Ed Gamble, Sian Gibson and Dara Ó Briain, Sindhu Vee
Series 2, Group 2: Steph McGovern, Ben Miller, Janette Manrara and Ed Balls (tie between McGovern and Balls)

Merchandise
On 17 October 2019, Osman and Alan Connor published Richard Osman's House of Games: 101 new & classic games from the hit BBC series, a quizbook based on the programme.

Footnotes

References

External links

BBC Press Release

2017 British television series debuts
2010s British game shows
2020s British game shows
2010s British television series
2020s British television series
BBC Scotland television shows
BBC television game shows
English-language television shows
Television series by Banijay